Philip Adjah Tettey-Narh (born 25 June 1998) is a Ghanaian professional footballer who plays as a forward for Rahmatganj MFS in the Bangladesh Premier League.

Career statistics

Club

Honours
Gokulam Kerala
I-League (1): 2020–21

References

External links

Living people
1998 births
Ghanaian footballers
Ghanaian expatriate footballers
Expatriate footballers in India
NEROCA FC players
Association football forwards
Rahmatganj MFS players